Karl Gustav Freiherr Clodt von Jürgensburg (Russian: Карл Фёдорович Клодт фон Юргенсбург; 1765–1822) was a general in the Imperial Russian Army during the Napoleonic Wars. He was of Baltic German descent.

Sources
https://www.adelsvapen.com/genealogi/Clodt_nr_126

1765 births
1822 deaths
Russian commanders of the Napoleonic Wars